Georg August Eduard Freiherr von Schnitzler (29 October 1884, in Cologne – 24 May 1962, in Basel) was a member of the board at IG Farben and a Nazi war criminal.

Early years
Schnitzler studied law at a number of universities, eventually completing his doctorate at the University of Leipzig in 1907. After a year's travel he went to work for Bankhaus J.H. Stein of Cologne. He married Lily von Mallinckrodt in 1910. His new wife was a noted figure in German high society and Baron von Schnitzer himself was noted for his immaculate dress sense and expensive tastes in wine and the arts.

Corporate career
In 1912 he moved to Farbwerke Hoechst, a company where his father held a leading position, and worked as a salesman of dyes in Munich for them. He joined the board as an alternate member in 1920 and achieved full membership in 1924. The company merged with IG Farben in 1925 and he was appointed an alternate member of their board, eventually becoming manager of their sales department in 1930. In 1927 he oversaw the establishment of a Franco-German dye sales cartel and by 1932 had added Swiss and British companies to the arrangement. He became chairman of the Commercial Committee of IG Farben in 1937.

Under the Nazis
In February 1933 von Schnitzer supported moves for IG Farben to provide financial backing to the Nazi Party. He had recently represented the company at a summit of leading German industrialists organised by Hjalmar Schacht and addressed by Adolf Hitler and had been impressed by the Nazi leader. Schnitzler did not immediately seek to join the Nazis after their seizure of power although he did establish a "salon" in Berlin at which high-ranking Nazis and leading industrialists could meet and discuss issues of mutual benefit. However he joined the Sturmabteilung in 1934 and eventually held the rank of Hauptsturmführer. He was admitted to the Nazi Party itself in 1937. 

In 1938, Freiherr von Schnitzler developed a scheme whereby IG Farben would fund German newspapers in Czechoslovakia to drive a massive pro-Nazi propaganda campaign. The scheme, which was eventually directed by Max Ilgner, played a central role in gaining ethnic German support for the annexation of the Sudetenland and the destruction of Czechoslovakia. He was also aware of the projected invasion of Poland during the summer of 1939 after being told of the plans by his friend Claus Ungewitter, an official in the Economics Ministry and an associate of leading figures in the Schutzstaffel. Following the invasion of Poland Schnitzler was sent into the country as the leader of an IG Farben delegation and in this role he ensured that a number of important Polish chemical factories came under the company's control. Following the invasion of France Schnitzler was once again despatched and once again he secured a number of chemical sites in France for IG Farben.

He was named one of the Nazi regime's Wehrwirtschaftsführers (war economy leaders) in 1942. His role at IG Farben continued to grow and in 1943 he was named chairman of the Chemical Committee. According to Diarmuid Jeffreys, Schnitzler was around this time also made aware of the "Final Solution" after his friend Martin Müller-Cunradi had told him about it following a visit to Buna Werke in 1943.

With defeat imminent Schnitzler dropped off the IG Farben scene in March 1945, retiring to his country estate at Oberursel (Taunus). Russell Nixon and James Martin, two agents attached to the US Military Government's Cartels Division, arrived on the estate in May and arrested Schnitzler.

Post-war
In the questioning following his arrest Schnitzler admitted to some "mistakes" on his part and agreed that IG Farben as a company had played a central role in the growth of Hitler and his arming of Germany. His frank responses did not meet the approval of many of his old colleagues and during a period of fraternisation in prison he was confronted by an angry Fritz ter Meer. Following their conversation Schnitzler announced that he wished to withdraw his earlier statements, claiming that they had been delivered under extreme pressure.

Brought to trial by the United States after the Second World War for war crimes, von Schnitzer was found guilty of "plunder and spoliation" and sentenced to five years imprisonment. However, after the U.S. military instituted a good behavior credit system, von Schnitzer, who had been in custody since 1945, was released from prison on 21 December 1945, several months before his sentence was supposed to expire. Following his release he returned to the business world as president of Deutsch-Ibero-Amerikanische Gesellschaft. He also returned to high society and occasionally showed up in the pages of European magazines covering these upper echelons.

Bibliography
Diarmuid Jeffreys, Hell's Cartel: IG Farben and the Making of Hitler's War Machine, Bloomsbury, 2009

References

External links
 

1884 births
1962 deaths
Businesspeople from Cologne
20th-century German businesspeople
German industrialists
German chemical industry people
IG Farben people
Prussian nobility
Sturmabteilung officers
Leipzig University alumni
German people convicted of crimes against humanity
People convicted by the United States Nuremberg Military Tribunals
People from the Rhine Province